José Acosta may refer to:
José Acosta (baseball) (1891–1977), Cuban baseball player
José Acosta Cubero (born 1947), Spanish politician 
José Antonio Acosta, Spanish Catholic priest
José de Acosta (1540–1600), Jesuit naturalist and missionary in Latin America
José Eugenio Acosta (1942–2006), Argentine equestrian
José Gerónimo Lluberas Acosta (1956–2003), Puerto Rican physician
José Julián Acosta (1825–1891), journalist and advocate of the abolition of slavery in Puerto Rico